Jamal Millner (born February 26, 1971) is a guitarist from West Virginia who was a member of the band 5x5 led by Corey Harris.

Early life
His parents went to "lots of shows". When he was four they took him to a Taj Mahal show and he got up on stage and played his plastic guitar. This was his very first "gig".

Discography

As leader
 Phatness (1997)

As sideman
2018
To Everyone in All the World: A Celebration of Pete Seeger
John McCutcheon
Guitar (Electric)

2009	
Chioggia Beat
Morwenna Lasko
Engineer, Guitar (Electric)

2003	
Box of the Blues
Producer, Guitar

2003	
Mississippi to Mali
Corey Harris
Engineer, Photography

2003	
Sleeping Lines
Plink
Guitar

2002	
Downhome Sophisticate (Alligator)
Corey Harris
Producer, Arranger, Composer

2001	
Untethered
Gar Ragland
Composer

1999
Greens from the Garden (Alligator)
Corey Harris and the 5x5
Guitar, Producer,Arranger

1999	
Live at the End of the World
Baaba Seth
Producer

1997	
Phatness
Jamal Millner
Primary Artist

1996	
Between White and Black
Barbara Martin
Bottleneck Guitar

Live! From Turtle Island
Corey Harris
Composer

References

External links
 Interview with Millner by Grown Folks Music 
 
 

1971 births
Living people
American blues guitarists
American male guitarists
Guitarists from West Virginia
Jazz musicians from Virginia
Musicians from Charlottesville, Virginia
21st-century American guitarists
21st-century American male musicians
American male jazz musicians